'Api Taufa is a Tongan New Zealander netball player who has represented Tonga internationally. She plays for the Central Manawa. She is the sister of netballer Salote Taufa.

Education 
Taufa was educated at Newlands College. In 2016 she was part of the championship-winning Wellington under-19 tournament team. She was then selected for the New Zealand under-19 netball team. In November 2016 she was selected as a trialist for the New Zealand Under-21 netball team.

Career 
In 2016 she was selected for the Central Manawa. In 2020 she ruptured her Achilles tendon. In February 2022 she was selected for the Central Manawa for the 2022 season. Later that year she was selected for the Tonga national netball team for the 2023 Netball World Cup Oceania qualifiers.

References

Living people
New Zealand sportspeople of Tongan descent
New Zealand netball players
Tongan netball players
Year of birth missing (living people)
National Netball League (New Zealand) players
Central Manawa players